Emerson Alejandro Chala (born 2 August 1991) is an Ecuadorian hurdler competing in the 400 metres hurdles.

Chala has represented his country in the Pan American Games, South American Games, Ibero-American Championships, and the Bolivarian Games.

In 2013 he was among the top 60 400 metre hurdlers in the world.  He also won the Ecuadorian National Games in the 400 metres hurdler event where he set a national record.

References

External links

1991 births
Living people
Ecuadorian male hurdlers
Pan American Games competitors for Ecuador
Athletes (track and field) at the 2011 Pan American Games
Athletes (track and field) at the 2018 South American Games